Constantin Heereman von Zuydtwyck (17 December 1931 in Münster – 26 July 2017 in Riesenbeck-Hörstel) was a German farmer and politician.

Life 

He went to school at Aloisiuskolleg in Bonn.
Heereman von Zuydtwyck was member of Christian Democratic Union of Germany.  From 1967 to 1979 Heereman von Zuydtwyck was president of Deutscher Bauernverband. From 1995 to 2003 he was president of Deutscher Jagdverband. From 1983 to 1990 Heereman von Zuydtwyck was member of German Bundestag. He was from 1974 to 1998 president of Landwirtschaftliche Rentenbank Since 1956 he was married with Margarethe Freiin von Wrede-Melschede (1931–2007). He had four daughters and a son Philipp Freiherr Heereman von Zuydtwyck.

Awards 
 1976: Orden wider den tierischen Ernst
 1973: Order of Merit of the Federal Republic of Germany
 1966: Decoration of Honour for Services to the Republic of Austria

References

External links 

 German National Bibliothek: Heereman von Zuydtwyck, Constantin
 Westfälische Nachrichten: Ein Kämpfer für Landwirte und Jäger

1931 births
2017 deaths
People from Hörstel
Members of the Bundestag for North Rhine-Westphalia
Members of the Bundestag 1987–1990
Members of the Bundestag 1983–1987
Members of the Bundestag for the Christian Democratic Union of Germany
German farmers
German foresters
German landowners
German hunters
Commanders Crosses of the Order of Merit of the Federal Republic of Germany